The  Pseudomon-Rho RNA motif refers to a conserved RNA structure that was discovered using bioinformatics.  The RNAs that conform to this motif (see diagram) are found in species within the genus Pseudomonas, as well as the related Azotobacter vinelandii.  They are consistently located in what could be the 5' untranslated regions of genes that encode the Rho factor protein, and this arrangement in bacteria suggested that Pseudomon-Rho RNAs might be cis-regulatory elements that regulate concentrations of the Rho protein.

References

External links
 

Cis-regulatory RNA elements